Moisey Davidovich Kasyanik (also "Moisei and Moysey" and "Kas'ianik, Kosyanik, or Kosianiki"; born January 1, 1911 – 1988) was a Soviet weightlifter.

He was Jewish, and was born in Novo-Zhitomyr, Kherson Guberniya (Russian Empire).

He won a gold medal at the 1937 Workers' Olympiad in Antwerp, and won bronze medals at the 1946 World Weightlifting Championships in Paris (60 kg) and at the 1947 European Weightlifting Championships in Helsinki (60 kg).

References

1911 births
1988 deaths
People from Khersonsky Uyezd
Jewish Ukrainian sportspeople
Jews from the Russian Empire
Soviet Jews
Soviet male weightlifters
Ukrainian male weightlifters
Jewish weightlifters
Sportspeople from Dnipropetrovsk Oblast
Lesgaft National State University of Physical Education, Sport and Health alumni
European Weightlifting Championships medalists
World Weightlifting Championships medalists
Honoured Masters of Sport of the USSR